The Trepteanca is a left tributary of the river Stăneasa in Romania. Formerly a direct tributary of the Olt, it flows into the Stăneasa near Olanu.

References

Rivers of Olt County
Rivers of Vâlcea County
Rivers of Romania